10:32 (film)  is a 1966 Dutch film by Arthur Dreifuss, starring Linda Christian, Eric Schneider and Bob de Lange. It is the debut of actress Linda van Dyck.

Cast 
 Linda Christian as Ellen Martens
 Bob de Lange as Inspector Stroomer
 Eric Schneider as Peter Hartman
 Wim van den Brink as Martens
 Wim de Haas as van Dijk
 Rudi West as Inspector Hofland
 Gerard de Groot as Anton Smit
 Linda van Dyck as Marijke
 Teddy Schaank as Saleswoman
 Lex Goudsmit as Max
 Louis Borel as Seller Blom

External links 
 

1966 films
Dutch black-and-white films
Films shot in the Netherlands
1960s Dutch-language films
Films directed by Arthur Dreifuss